The American singer Vanessa Carlton has received multiple nominations, including three Grammy Awards nominations and six Billboard Music Awards nominations. She has received four awards.

American Music Awards

|-
|2003
| Herself
|Favorite Adult Contemporary Artist
|
|}

APRA Music Awards

|-
|2003
|"A Thousand Miles"
|Most Performed Foreign Work
|
|}

BDSCertified Spin Awards

|-
|2003
|"A Thousand Miles"
|500,000 Spins
|
|}

BMI Pop Awards

|-
| 2003
|"A Thousand Miles"
|Award-Winning Song
|
|}

Billboard Music Awards

|-
|rowspan=4|2002
|rowspan=2|Herself
|New Artist of the Year
|rowspan=6 
|-
|Top Hot 100 Artist - Female
|-
|rowspan=3|"A Thousand Miles"
|Top Hot Top 40 Track
|-
|Top Adult Top 40 Track
|-
|rowspan=2|2003
|Top Adult Contemporary Track
|-
|Herself
|Top Adult Contemporary Artist
|}

Grammy Awards

|-
|rowspan=3|2003
|rowspan=3|"A Thousand Miles"
|Record of the Year
|rowspan=3 
|-
|Song of the Year
|-
|Best Instrumental Arrangement Accompanying Vocalist(s)
|-

Japan Gold Disc Awards

|-
|2003
|Herself
|New Artist Of The Year
|
|}

Teen Choice Awards

|-
|2003
|"Pretty Baby"
|Choice Music - Love Song
|
|}

VH1 Big Awards

|-
| rowspan=2|2002
| Herself
| Lolita Ford Award
| 
|-
| "A Thousand Miles"
| Can't Get You Out of My Head
|

References

Carlton, Vanessa